Boronia fraseri, commonly known as Fraser's boronia, is a plant in the citrus family occurring near Sydney in Australia. It is an erect, multi-branched shrub with pinnate leaves and pink flowers arranged in small groups in the leaf axils.

Description
There are between three and seven elliptic leaflets. The eight stamens alternate in length with those opposite the petals shorter than those near the sepals.

Taxonomy and naming
Boronia fraseri was first formally described by William Jackson Hooker in 1843 and the description was published in The Botanical Magazine. The specific epithet (fraseri) honours Charles Fraser, the first superintendent of the Royal Botanic Gardens, Sydney.

Distribution and habitat
Unlike many Boronia plants, Fraser's boronia prefers moist gullies and rainforest areas, on soils based on sandstone and is found mainly in the Sydney region but also occurs in the Blue Mountains.

Conservation
Fraser's boronia is rare plant, with a ROTAP rating of 2RCa.

Use in horticulture
Well drained soils with part shade are advised for cultivation. Boronia "Telopea Valley Star" is a hybrid between this species and Boronia mollis, which is hardier and has been grown in Australian gardens.

References

External links

fraseri
Flora of New South Wales
Apiales of Australia
Taxa named by William Jackson Hooker
Plants described in 1843